Quinapondan (IPA: [ˌkinɐˈpondan]), officially the Municipality of Quinapondan, is a 5th class municipality in the province of Eastern Samar, Philippines. According to the 2020 census, it has a population of 14,507 people.

Geography

Barangays
Quinapondan is politically subdivided into 25 barangays.

Climate

Demographics

Economy

References

External links
 [ Philippine Standard Geographic Code]
 Philippine Census Information
 Local Governance Performance Management System

Municipalities of Eastern Samar